Artyom Pavlovich Kulesha (born 14 January 1990) is a Russian professional footballer.

Career 
Kulesha was registered as a defender for Zenit in the 2008 season. However, he never made it to the first team and played just four times for the reserves. In 2009 Kulesha made his professional debut in the Russian Second Division for Zenit feeder team FC Smena-Zenit St. Petersburg, and in August 2009 he signed a contract with FC Rubin Kazan.

External links 
 
  Profile at stats.sportbox.ru
  Career summary at Footballfacts

1990 births
Footballers from Saint Petersburg
Living people
Russian footballers
Russia under-21 international footballers
Association football midfielders
FC Zenit Saint Petersburg players
FC Rubin Kazan players
FC Rostov players
FC Dynamo Saint Petersburg players
FC Znamya Truda Orekhovo-Zuyevo players
Kultsu FC players
Buxoro FK players
Russian Premier League players
Kakkonen players
Uzbekistan Super League players
Kyrgyz Premier League players
Russian expatriate footballers
Expatriate footballers in Finland
Expatriate footballers in Uzbekistan
Expatriate footballers in Kyrgyzstan